The Green Futures of Tycho is a 1981 science fiction novel for young audiences by William Sleator. The book explores time travel and the consequences of Tycho's choices.

Plot summary
The main character is Tycho Tithonus, an 11-year-old boy. Each child in his family is named after a famous artist or scientist and their parents expect them to live up to their names. Tycho himself is named after Sleator's younger brother, who in turn, was named after Tycho Brahe, the Danish astronomer. Tycho Tithonus finds a silver egg time machine that gives him the ability to travel into the past and the future. He uses this ability to bother his siblings. When Tycho visits the terrible future his actions will lead to, he risks his life to save his family by destroying the egg.

Further Information
The Green Futures of Tycho was one source of inspiration for the Interactive Fiction work Shrapnel by Adam Cadre.

External links
 The Green Futures of Tycho - a fan site.

References

1981 American novels
Novels by William Sleator
1981 science fiction novels
Novels about time travel